James Tyler may refer to:

 James Tyler (bobsleigh) (born 1960), American Olympic bobsledder
 James Tyler (musician) (1940–2010), American lutenist and early music researcher
 James Hoge Tyler (1846–1925), American politician and governor of Virginia
 James Manning Tyler (1835–1926), United States Representative from Vermont
 James Michael Tyler (1962–2021), American actor
 James Tyler Guitars, electric guitar manufacturer in California

See also
 Tyler James (disambiguation)